Victor Olgyay (September 1, 1910 – April 22, 1970) was an architect, city planner, and early researcher in the field of Bioclimatic design. He was an Associate Professor at the School of Architecture and Urban Planning of Princeton University until 1970 and, with his twin brother Aladar, a pioneer in the field of Bioclimatic design in the 1950's and 60's.

Background
Their first article was "The Temperate House" (1951), followed by other works on "Bioclimatic Approach to Architecture" and "To Pave to Bio-climatical Control and Orientation to Meet Requirements" (1954). More articles arose like "Sun orientation" and finally,"Environment and building shape" (1954).  As of that moment the Olgyays became a huge reference to various new kind of architecture like solar Architecture, passive Architecture, bio-climatice Architecture.

The energy crisis of the 1970's caused a significant economic damage to the developed world and greatly increased interest in the Olgyay brothers work.

Victor Olgyay died in 1970.

Architecture and climate
This is a book where Victor Olgyay writes about the relationship between buildings and nature surrounds it. The book is separated into three parts concerning the climate and their relationship to human being, the interpretation of the effect on climate architectonic key and to its application in Architecture and Urbanism.   Altogether "Architecture and Climate", develops into one complete theory of the architectonic design, supported by logical and theoretical justifications with coherent explanation of physical principles. Olgyay also relates methods and knowledge of other disciplines like Biology, Meteorology and Climatology, Engineering and Physics. These basic principles are applicable to any present project or recycling of an old building to help them adapt to its site and thus help reduce the environmental impact that it generates.

Content of architecture and climate
The book is divided in three parts: Climatic Interpretation, Interpretation according to architectonic principles and Application.

Part 1: The "Climatic Interpretation" is a general introduction to a bio-climatic interpretation of climatic Elements. This first part is of great importance since it proposes his famous bio-climatic graph that is still in use today as a tool used by various bio-climatic architects world wide.

Part 2: The "Interpretation According to Architectonic Principles" goes on from Chapter 5 to 10 focuses on various Architectonic Principles. These consists of the election of location, the solar control, the wind drifts, models of air flow and the thermal effects of the materials.

Part 3: The "Application" focus mainly on the application of architectonic principles on four regions, the temperate zone, the cold zone, the warm-barren zone and the warm humid zone.

See also
Tschögl building, Budapest ("A house reversed") - Városmajor utca 50, Budapest.

Sources

External links
 Bio-Climatic Approach to Architectural Regionalism
Spanish Wikipedia Article on Victor Olgyay 
 Official Website on Victor Olgyay's son
 Linkedin About Victor Olgyay's Son

1910 births
1970 deaths
20th-century Hungarian architects